It's Martini Time is the fourth album by The Reverend Horton Heat. It was released by Interscope Records in July 1996.  It's Martini Time is the first Reverend Horton Heat album to feature Scott Churilla on drums, following Taz Bentley's departure from the band in 1994.  It is also the first Reverend Horton Heat album to chart on the Billboard 200, reaching number 165 (the second highest position of a Reverend Horton Heat album on that chart).

"Rock the Joint" is the 1952 Bill Haley version with new lyrics and a different arrangement than the 1949 Jimmy Preston recording.

The song "Big Red Rocket of Love" appears in the film Modern Vampires and in the video game MotorStorm on PlayStation 3.

Track listing
All songs written by Jim Heath except as noted.
"Big Red Rocket of Love" – 3:04
"Slow" – 4:23
"It's Martini Time" – 3:14
"Generation Why" – 2:46
"Slingshot" (Heath/Wallace/Churilla) – 3:07
"Time to Pray" – 2:40
"Crooked Cigarette" – 2:54
"Rock the Joint" (Crafton/Keene/Bagby) – 2:04
"Cowboy Love" – 2:41
"Now, Right Now" – 2:39
"Spell On Me" – 3:18
"Or Is It Just Me" – 5:30
"Forbidden Jungle" – 2:18
"That's Showbiz" – 4:35

Personnel
Jim "Reverend Horton" Heath - vocals, guitar
Jimbo Wallace - upright bass, fiddle, vocals
Scott Churilla - drums, vocals, percussion
Tim Alexander - piano, organ, and accordion
Dan Phillips - steel guitar
Billy Pitman - guitar
Jim Lehnert - tenor sax, baritone sax
Gary Sweet - trumpet
Erik Swanson - trombone
Thom Panunzio - producer, engineer, mixing (on "Crooked Cigarette", "Rock The Joint", "Cowboy Love", "Or Is It Just Me", and "That's Showbiz")
Keith Rust - assistant engineer, mixing (on "It's Martini Time", "Now, Right Now", "Spell On Me", and "Forbidden Jungle")
Terry Slemmons - assistant engineer
David Nottingham - assistant mixer
Chris Shaw - mixing (on "Big Red Rocket of Love", "Slow", "Generation Why", "Slingshot", and "Time To Pray")
Robert Vosgien - mastering
Tony Ferguson - A&R
Dennis Williams - crew
David Adriance - crew
Blair Campbell - crew
Allan Nassau - crew
Karma Cheema - crew
Doc Williamson - crew
Scott Weiss - management
Unleashed - art direction
Jennifer Broussard - photography
Marina Chavez - photography
Richard Lee Smith, Jr. - additional illustration

Charts

References

1996 albums
The Reverend Horton Heat albums
Albums produced by Thom Panunzio
Interscope Records albums